The Union of European Federalists (UEF) is a European non-governmental organisation, campaigning for a Federal Europe. It consists of 20 constituent organisations and it has been active at the European, national and local levels since 1946.

History
The foundation of the UEF goes back to the Hertenstein Conference of 78 representatives of federalist movements from 16 European countries in September 1946 in Hertenstein, near Zürich in Switzerland. These groups held the common belief that only a European Federation based on the idea of unity in diversity could prevent a repetition of the suffering and destruction of the two world wars, so they adopted a declaration-programme which was based on this idea. Federalists believed that only a common effort of European citizens working towards this goal could create a peaceful and democratic Europe guaranteeing freedom and the protection of human rights.

At a second meeting in Luxembourg these groups agreed on establishing a permanent European secretariat in Paris and another one in New York City for global federalists. But it was in Paris, on 15 and 16 December 1946 that UEF was officially brought into life, its function being to co-ordinate and intensify the activities of the different movements and to organise them into a federal structure.

After getting a legal status UEF campaigned for the European Federal Pact. It consisted of an attempt to transform the Advisory Assembly of the Council of Europe into the Constituent Assembly of the European Federation. The fundamental tool was a petition, signed by thousands of citizens across Europe and a large number of eminent people in political, intellectual and scientific life, which asked the Advisory Assembly to draw up a text for a federal pact, and recommend its ratification to the member states of the Council of Europe. UEF also campaigned for the ratification of the European Defence Community and for the establishment of a political community.

After rejection of the EDC project the federalists became increasingly divided as to the strategy to be followed by the U.E.F. between those who, following Altiero Spinelli (1907–1986), favoured the constitutional approach, and those who preferred a step-by-step approach.  The former could not be satisfied with a mere common market; the latter fully supported it.  This conflict led to a split of the UEF in July 1956 and its division into two organisations: the "Mouvement Fédéraliste Européen" (M.F.E.), formed from militants of the former constitutional persuasion, and the "Action Européenne Fédéraliste" (A.E.F.) bringing together those of the latter.

But once the customs union had been established, bringing with it the prospect of developing into an economic and monetary union, the two federalist organisations came to agree on the desirability of coming together to relaunch their political activities, built around the campaign for direct elections to the European Parliament. This strategic idea, propounded by the Italian federalists, quickly became the joint platform of all the federalist organisations that met in April 1973, thus recreating UEF.

Activities of UEF included public demonstrations attracting thousands of participants. For example, the demonstration in conjunction with the European Council in Rome in December 1975, where it was decided that the European election would be held even without the participation of the United Kingdom and Denmark (although in the end, they did take part), a demonstration with 5,000 participants in Strasbourg on 17 July 1979 in front of the seat of the European Parliament, to coincide with its first session after its election in June the demonstration coinciding with the European Council in Fontainebleau on 25 June 1984 and the spectacular demonstration in Milan – its 100,000 participants make it the biggest popular demonstration in the history of the federalist struggle – in conjunction with the European Council of 28 and 29 June 1985, where the majority decided to call an Intergovernmental Conference to review to Community treaties.

The fall of the Berlin Wall, the end of the cold war, German reunification and the ratification of the Maastricht Treaty led to the UEF campaign for European Democracy which included the desire to eliminate border controls between the countries of the European Union, parallelism between widening and deepening, strengthening of the roles of the European Parliament and the European Commission, extension of majority voting and the removal of governmental monopoly over the constituent function.

An important part of the history of UEF was the Campaign for the Federal European Constitution in Nice in which 10,000 people, including hundreds of local administrators, participated.

Presidents
Presidents of the Executive Board
Hendrik Brugmans 1947–1949
Henry Frenay 1950–1952
Altiero Spinelli 1955–1956
Grigore Gafencu 1956
Alexandre Marc 1957
Raymond Rifflet 1959–1964
Mario Albertini 1966

Presidents (until 1966 of the "Presidents of the Central Committee")
 Henri Genet 1947
 Henry Frenay 1948–1949
 Hendrik Brugmans 1950
 Eugen Kogon 1950–1952
 Henry Frenay 1955
 Grigore Gafencu 1956
 Enzo Giacchero 1957
 Enzo Giacchero 1959–1962
 Etienne Hirsch 1964–1972
 Etienne Hirsch – J.H.C Molenaar 1972
 Mario Albertini 1975–1982
 John Pinder 1984–1987
 Francesco Rossolillo 1989–1994
 Jo Leinen 1997–2004
 Mercedes Bresso 2006–2008
 Andrew Duff 2008–2013
 Elmar Brok 2013–2018
 Sandro Gozi Since 2018

Secretaries General
 Raymond Silva 1947–1948
 Albert Lohest 1949–1950
 Guglielmo Usellini 1950–1957
 André Delmas 1959–1962
 Orio Giarini 1962–1967
 Ludo Dierickx 1969
 Caterina Chizzola 1972–1989
 Gérard Vissels 1992–1994
 Bruno Boissière 1997–2004
 Friedhelm Frischenschlager 2005–2006
 Joan Marc Simon 2007–2010
 Christian Wenning 2010–2014
 Paolo Vacca since 2014

Deputy general secretary
Henri Koch-Kent 1946. Also active in its founding, at Luxembourg meeting.

Organization

UEF consists of constituent organisations that are autonomous centres of UEF activities, reaching the EU citizens and spreading the UEF message to them by organising various activities in their countries. Constituent organisations are free to take up any activities within the general political framework of UEF at the European level.

Congress
The Congress is the 'general assembly' of UEF. It meets every two years; it consists of delegates of the UEF constituent organisations. It determines the policy of UEF, elects the UEF president, modifies provisions of the Statutes and elects half of the Federal Committee members.

Federal Committee
The FC consists of members of whom 50% are elected directly by the UEF Congress and 50% by the constituent organisations. The members are elected to serve until the next UEF Congress. 
The FC determines the UEF political direction and activities between the Congresses. It organises the Congress, approves the annual budget and final account balances, draws up the rules of procedure of UEF, and elects the UEF Bureau and Treasurer.

Bureau
Elected by the Federal Committee for a period of two years, the Bureau carries out the decisions of and is accountable to the Federal Committee.

Conference of Representatives
It is convened upon the request of the UEF Bureau or at least two constituent organisations. The Conference gathers the representatives of the constituent organisations and of UEF supranational (namely, the President, Secretary-General and Treasurer). It presents its proposals to the Federal Committee and has an advisory and co-ordinating role. The Conference also determines the membership fee.

President
The UEF president is elected by the UEF Congress by absolute majority vote. He is also the President of the Federal Committee and of the UEF Bureau. Currently the UEF president is the Italian Sandro Gozi.

Treasurer
Elected by the Federal Committee on the nomination of the Bureau, They are responsible for the management of the funds. They are accountable to the Federal Committee. The current UEF Treasurer is David Martinez Garcia.

Secretary-General
The UEF Secretary-General is responsible for running the UEF secretariat and carrying out the decisions delegated to them by the organs of UEF. They participate in the meetings of the organs of UEF without the right to vote. They are appointed by the Federal Committee on recommendation of the Bureau. 
Currently the UEF Secretary-General is Paolo Vacca.

Arbitration Board
Consists of seven members elected by the Congress. It ensures the application of the Statutes and serves as an arbiter in case of disputes within the organisation.

Member organisations 

Europäische Föderalistische Bewegung Österreich(UEF Austria)
U.E.F. België / U.E.F. Belgique (UEF Belgium)
U.E.F. Balgarija(UEF Bulgaria)
Unie evropských federalistů v České republice (U.E.F. Czech Republic)
European Federalist Movement of Cyprus (UEF Cyprus)
Europa-Union Deutschland (UEF Germany)
Eurooppafederalistit  (U.E.F. Finland)
European Federalist Movement Greece (UEF Greece)
Union des fédéralistes européens (U.E.F. France)
Európai Föderalisták Uniója (UEF Hungary)
Movimento Federalista Europeo (UEF Italy)
Europos federalistai Lietuvoje (UEF Lithuania)
UEF Luxembourg
UEF Crna Gora (UEF Montenegro)
UEF Portugal(UEF Portugal)
UEF Romania
Únia európskych federalistov (UEF Slovakia)
Unión de Europeístas y Federalistas de España (UEF Spain)
Unija evropskih federalista (UEF Serbia)
Europafederalisterna (UEF Sweden)
Mouvement européen Suisse/Europäische Bewegung Schweiz/Movimento europeo Svizzera (UEF Switzerland)
Federal Union (UEF United Kingdom)
UEF Europe Groupe

Mission
The mission of the UEF is the following:

To raise the awareness of the public about European issues, the UEF is organising public debates, seminars, info stands, campaign and street actions on key European issues and developments.
To exercise pressure on the like-minded politicians by lobbying actions, establishing Platforms (aiming to spread the understanding of federalism) and initiating debates in the European and national parliaments. 
To spread the ideas through a strong communication via press releases, the UEF website and newsletter and other policy statements to the widest European public and actors.
To cooperate with others non-governmental organisations (NGOs) and especially of the European Civil Society like the Young European Federalists (JEF) and the European Movement and finally to put pressure on politicians by organising public manifestations.

See also 
 Jeunes Européens Fédéralistes
 Federal Europe
 The Spinelli Group
 European Movement
 Non-Conformist Movement
 Federalist flag
 Centre for Studies on Federalism
 World Federalist Movement

References

Further reading

External links 
 
 UEF Belgique
 Archives of the Union of European Federalists at the Historical Archives of EU in Florence
  Movimento Federalista Europeo
 Europa-Union Deutschland
 The Federalist Debate
 The Federalist·Le Fédéraliste·Il Federalista

Eurofederalism
Organizations related to the European Union
Organisations based in Brussels
Political theories
World federalist movement member organizations